Daniel Wells (born 31 July 1988) is a Welsh professional snooker player from Neath. He has twice come through Qualifying School to play on the professional snooker tour.

Career

Early career
He was awarded the inaugural Paul Hunter Scholarship. This gave him the chance to practise in the World Snooker Academy in Sheffield, alongside professional players, such as Peter Ebdon and Ding Junhui.

He first qualified for the Main Tour for the 2008–09 season by finishing ranked fifth on the International Open Series rankings.

2008/2009
He had consistent results on his first spell on the main tour, winning his first qualifying match in most events, apart from defeat in the first qualifying round to Stefan Mazrocis in the Grand Prix. This was followed by a run to the penultimate qualifying round of the Bahrain Championship where he lost to veteran John Parrott 3–5.

An impressive run to the last 16 of the Masters Qualifying tournament included a 5–4 win over Crucible quarter-finalist Liang Wenbo. He followed this with a defeat to Li Hang in the first qualifying round of UK Championship 3–9.

However, at the World Championship, Wells needed a good run of results to ensure his place on the tour for the following season. A sequence of 10–9 wins over Li Hang, Ian Preece and Marcus Campbell took him to the final qualifying round where he lost 9–10 to Barry Hawkins in the final qualifying match. In his 4 qualifying matches, he played the maximum 76 frames. His ranking rose to No. 70 as a result of his exploits that season.

2009/2010
Wells started the new season with a win over fellow Welshman Ian Preece 5–3 in the Shanghai Masters before losing to Joe Delaney in the next round by the same scoreline. In the UK Championship, he narrowly lost 8–9 to fellow Welshman Michael White. In his home championship, the Welsh Open, Wells narrowly lost in the first qualifying round to James Wattana 4–5. Another first qualifying round defeat in the China Open meant that Wells was again in danger of losing his place on the tour. Wells failed to repeat his exploits of the previous season in the World Championship as he lost 7–10 to former world No. 12 David Gray in the first qualifying round. This meant that he fell off the tour.

2010/2011
Despite not being on the main tour during the 2010–11 season Wells entered many of the PTC and EPTC events, and recorded some impressive wins eventually finishing 29th on the Order of Merit. He regained a place on the main tour for 2011–12 by finishing top of the Welsh rankings. Wells also won the European Snooker Championships and the European Team Championships (with team Wales).

2011/2012
As an unranked player on the tour Wells would need to win four qualifying matches to reach the main draw of the ranking events. However, he only won three matches during the season, including going without a single victory in the 11 of 12 Players Tour Championship events that he played. He finished the season without a ranking and had to enter Q School in an attempt to earn a place on the tour for the 2012–13 season. In May, Wells won five matches at the second Q School event concluding with a 4–3 win over Michael Wasley to earn a place on the tour for the next two seasons.

2012/2013
Wells did not win two consecutive matches in qualifying for any of the ranking events in the 2012/2013 season, and therefore did not reach the main draw for any tournaments. He played in all ten Players Tour Championship events this season, with his best results being two last 64 defeats, to be placed 101st on the PTC Order of Merit. His season ended when he was beaten 7–10 by Aditya Mehta in the first round of World Championship Qualifying which saw him finish ranked world number 87.

2013/2014
Wells lost in the qualifying rounds of the first five ranking events in the 2013–14 season, but received automatic entry into the UK Championship as all 128 players began the tournament in the first round. It was here that Wells won the first match at a main venue for the first time in his career by defeating Alfie Burden 6–4, but he then lost 6–3 to Joe Perry. The only event Wells qualified for this season was the German Masters, with an impressive 5–1 victory over Nigel Bond, before he was eliminated in the first round 5–1 by Gary Wilson. After Wells was beaten 10–7 by Kurt Maflin in the second round of World Championship qualifying he was ranked world number 100 meaning he could no longer reach the top 64 and was relegated from the tour. He played in Q School in an attempt to regain his place and came closest to doing so in the second event when he lost in the last 16 to Ashley Carty.

2014/2015
Wells was back to being an amateur player for the 2014–15 season, but still considered himself as a professional as he was playing for his living. He faced Ronnie O'Sullivan in the first round of the UK Championship and, despite his opponent playing with a broken ankle, Wells was beaten 6–2. He lost 4–2 to Gerard Greene in the first round of the Welsh Open. Wells qualified for his first China Open by defeating Robbie Williams 5–3 and lost the last three frames in the first round against Graeme Dott to be eliminated 5–3. At Event 1 of Q School he eliminated Alexander Ursenbacher 4–1 in the final round to earn a two-year tour card starting with the 2015–16 season.

2015/2016
Wells played in his first International Championship by beating Rory McLeod 6–1 and advanced through a wildcard round in China, before losing 6–4 to Lee Walker in the first round. He won three matches to reach the last 16 of the Bulgarian Open where he was eliminated 4–0 by Mike Dunn. He would finish 39th on the European Order of Merit. Wells saw off Rod Lawler 6–4 at the UK Championship, despite abandoning his car due to traffic and running to the venue before the match. He lost 6–3 to Ali Carter in the second round. Wells reached the same stage of the Welsh Open by beating Andrew Higginson 4–2, but was knocked out 4–1 by Marco Fu.

2016/2017
Wells began using a new cue at the beginning of the 2016–17 season and it proved to be his most successful year to date. He qualified for the World Open by thrashing Tian Pengfei 5–0 and then beat Xu Si 5–3, before recording another 5–0 whitewash this time over Kyren Wilson to reach the last 16 of a ranking event for the first time. After being 2–0 down to Ali Carter he moved 4–2 ahead, before missing chances to play in the quarter-finals and was defeated 5–4. Wells qualified for the International Championship by overcoming Mark Allen 6–5 and eliminated Stuart Carrington 6–2 in the first round, but then lost 6–5 to Michael Holt having been 5–3 up.
A 6–5 win over Ian Burns at the UK Championship saw Wells face world number one Mark Selby in the second round. Wells was 3–1 ahead, but would be defeated 6–4. He advanced to the third round of both the Scottish Open and Gibraltar Open, losing 4–3 to Yu Delu and 4–0 to Nigel Bond respectively. Wells qualified for the China Open with a 5–3 victory over Marco Fu and reached the last 16 for the second time this season by beating Jamie Cope 5–3 and Matthew Stevens 5–2, but lost 5–1 to Stephen Maguire. Wells finished a season within the top 64 in the world rankings for the first time as he was number 62.

2018/2019
He advanced to the quarter-final of the Paul Hunter Classic losing 4–3 to Kyren Wilson. Wells reached the semifinal of a ranking tournament for the first time at the 2018 Scottish Open, and despite leading 4–0, and 5–2 over Mark Allen he lost 6–5. He advanced to the four round of both the English Open, Shoot-Out and Gibraltar Open, losing 4–3 to Ali Carter, 1–0 to Rod Lawler and 4–3 to David Gilbert respectively.

Performance and rankings timeline

Other
In 2009 Wells recorded a series of snooker tutorial videos at the World Snooker Academy. These were launched as a subscription based online coaching program in February 2010 under the name of SnookerGuide.co.uk.

Career finals

Pro-am finals: 1

Amateur finals: 5 (3 titles)

References

External links

Daniel Wells at worldsnooker.com
 
 Profile on Global Snooker
 Daniel Wells Snooker Coaching

Welsh snooker players
1988 births
Living people
Snooker players from Neath